Piletocera microdontalis is a moth in the family Crambidae. It was described by George Hampson in 1907. It is found in Papua New Guinea, where it has been recorded from Woodlark Island.

References

microdontalis
Endemic fauna of Papua New Guinea
Moths of Papua New Guinea
Woodlark Islands
Moths described in 1907
Taxa named by George Hampson